Henry Stuart (5 April 1804 – 26 October 1854, Kempston) was an English politician.

Stuart was elected MP for Bedford in 1837, but unseated on petition in May 1838. He was MP for Bedford again from 1841 until his death.

References
Boase, F., Modern English biography, 6 vols, 1892–1921.

External links 
 

1804 births
1854 deaths
Conservative Party (UK) MPs for English constituencies
UK MPs 1837–1841
UK MPs 1841–1847
UK MPs 1847–1852
UK MPs 1852–1857